Šenoa is a Croatian surname of German origin, originally Schönoa. Notable people with the surname include:

 August Šenoa (1838–1881), Croatian writer
 Branko (Branimir) Šenoa (1879–1939), Croatian painter, graphic artist and art historian
 Milan Šenoa (1869–1961), Croatian geographer, son of August Šenoa